Savitri was one of the leading Indian actress of the 1950s and 1960s. She ranked as the biggest leading lady of the South Indian Film Industry for more than a decade and acted in 138 Telugu films; 100 Tamil films; 6 Kannada films; 5 Hindi films and 3 Malayalam films that make the total of 252 films spending 30 years in the cinema industry. She died at the age of 46.

Filmography

Released films

Unreleased and unfinished films

 Naai Vandhi Chennappa (Tamil) (1966)
 Maadi Veettu Ezhai (Tamil) (1969)

References

Indian filmographies
Actress filmographies